Apoorva Mehta is an Indian-Canadian businessman. He founded the grocery delivery company Instacart. In 2020, Mehta became a billionaire at the age of 33. As of 2021, his company was valued at $39 billion.

Early life and education
Mehta was born in 1986 in India. He moved to Libya shortly after he was born, and then to Hamilton, Ontario, Canada when he was 14. He graduated from the University of Waterloo with an electrical engineering degree.

Early career
Mehta worked as a design engineer at Blackberry and Qualcomm before joining Amazon in 2008. While at Amazon, he worked as a supply-chain engineer. Mehta left Amazon and moved to San Francisco in 2010. Between 2010 and 2012, he launched 20 startups, all of which failed.

Instacart
He founded Instacart in 2012. That year, he tried to apply for funding through Y Combinator but missed the deadline. He eventually got a meeting by sending a pack of beer to a Y Combinator partner using his grocery delivery service and was later admitted. By 2020, Mehta had become a billionaire at age 33 with a 10% stake in his company. In 2021, Instacart was valued at $39 billion. In July 2021, Mehta stepped down as CEO and is now serving as the executive chairman. Fidji Simo, former head of the Facebook app, is Instacart's new CEO.

Mehta was included on Forbes 30 under 30 in 2013. In 2021, he was included on the Time 100 Next.

Funding 

Apoorva Mehta is also an investor in an AI led adtech influencer marketing platform Kofluence. The company had raised a pre-series funding of $4 Million as of 8th February 2022.

References 

1986 births
Living people
Indian chief executives
Indian billionaires
University of Waterloo alumni